During the 1998–99 English football season, West Ham United F.C. competed in the FA Premier League (known as the FA Carling Premiership for sponsorship reasons).

Season summary
In the 1998–99 season, the Hammers finished fifth in the Premier League, their second-best placing ever in the top-flight, securing UEFA Cup qualification to mark a return to European competitions after 19 years away.

New additions to the side for the season were goalkeeper Shaka Hislop, defender Neil Ruddock, Marc Keller and Arsenal goalscoring legend Ian Wright, while mid-season arrivals came in the shape of midfielder Marc-Vivien Foé, defender Scott Minto and striker Paolo Di Canio. During the course of the season, several key players left the club, including veteran defender Tim Breacker, unsettled striker John Hartson and winger Andy Impey. April saw the retirement of defender Richard Hall, who had struggled with injuries since his arrival from Southampton in July 1996.

The season also saw the emergence of highly promising midfielder Joe Cole, who played his first eight league games and made a further appearance in the FA Cup.

Final league table

Results summary

Results
West Ham United's score comes first

Legend

FA Premier League

FA Cup

League Cup

Squad

Transfers

In

Out

Transfers in:  £9,280,000
Transfers out:  £9,140,000
Total spending:  £140,000

References

West Ham United F.C. seasons
West Ham United
1998 sports events in London
1999 sports events in London